Clare Fearnley is a diplomat from New Zealand who is their Ambassador to China and Mongolia.  At the time of her appointment, Fearnley was Ambassador to South Korea (cross-accredited to Pyongyang) and had been Acting Director-General Legal at the Ministry of Foreign Affairs and Trade and Consul-General in Shanghai.

Fearnley earned arts and law degrees from Canterbury University, studied at Beijing University and at the Beijing Languages Institute in the 1980s. She is a native Mandarin speaker.

References

Ambassadors of New Zealand to China
New Zealand women ambassadors
Ambassadors of New Zealand to South Korea
Ambassadors of New Zealand to Mongolia
Ambassadors of New Zealand to North Korea
Living people
Year of birth missing (living people)
University of Canterbury alumni
21st-century New Zealand women politicians